Robert Laxton (born 7 September 1944) is a British Labour Party politician who was the Member of Parliament (MP) for Derby North from 1997 until standing down at the 2010 general election.

Early life and education
Laxton attended the Woodlands Secondary Modern School (became the Woodlands Community School) on Blenheim Drive in Allestree. He also attended the Derby College of Art and Technology.

Career 
Laxton was a telecommunications engineer for the General Post Office from 1961. Whilst in this employment, he was a union representative and branch official for the Post Office Engineering Union, which became the National Communications Union in 1985, and finally the Communication Workers Union in 1995.

Prior to becoming an MP, he was leader of Derby City Council from 1986 to 1988 and again from 1994 to 1997. He was first elected to the city council in 1979.

Parliamentary career 
During the 2001 Parliament he served as Parliamentary Private Secretary to Alan Johnson, an old friend from his days as a union official who was Higher Education Minister and then Secretary of State for Work and Pensions before resigning from this role in 2005 to become a British representative on the Council of Europe.

He was chair of the Waterways All-Party Parliamentary Group.

On 19 October 2009, Laxton announced his intention to stand down at the next general election.

References

External links
 Guardian Unlimited Politics - Ask Aristotle: Bob Laxton MP
 TheyWorkForYou.com - Bob Laxton MP

News items
 Boycotting the Labour conference in 2005

1944 births
Living people
Labour Party (UK) MPs for English constituencies
UK MPs 1997–2001
UK MPs 2001–2005
UK MPs 2005–2010
Alumni of the University of Derby
Politicians from Derby
Members of the Parliament of the United Kingdom for constituencies in Derbyshire
Councillors in Derby
British Telecom people